Porridge & Hotsauce is the tenth studio album by the Australian rock band You Am I. It was released on 6 November 2015.

The album was mainly recorded at Daptone's House of Soul Studio in Bushwick, Brooklyn, United States with some additional recording taking place at two studios in Melbourne.

Track listing

 "Good Advices"
 "Bon Vivants"
 "No, A Minor Blue"
 "Two Hands"
 "One Drink At A Time"
 "Out To The Never, Now"
 "Daemons"
 "Beehive"
 "Buzz The Boss"
 "She Said Goodbye"
 "My Auld Friend"
 "An East Doncaster Gurl"
 "Porridge & Hotsauce"

Charts

References

2015 albums
You Am I albums